Beyond the Blue Bird is an album by jazz pianist Tommy Flanagan, with guitarist Kenny Burrell, bassist George Mraz, and drummer Lewis Nash.

Background
Flanagan's first musical residence, in 1949, was at the Blue Bird Inn in Detroit. As a teenager, he also played with guitarist Kenny Burrell. After two years of military service, Flanagan again became house pianist at the Blue Bird, and again worked with Burrell.

Recording and music 
The album was recorded on April 29 and 30, 1990, at Studio 44, in Monster, the Netherlands.

Reception 
The AllMusic reviewer concluded that the album is "a perfect introduction to this tasteful, swinging and creative (within the bop mainstream) pianist."

Track listing 
"Bluebird"
"Yesterdays"
"50-21"
"Blues in My Heart"
"Barbados"
"Beyond the Bluebird"
"Nascimento"
"The Con Man"
"Something Borrowed Something Blue"
"Bluebird After Dark"

Personnel 
 Tommy Flanagan – piano
 Kenny Burrell – guitar 
 George Mraz – bass
 Lewis Nash – drums

References 

Bibliography

 

1991 albums
Tommy Flanagan albums